Senator Bruce may refer to:

Members of the United States Senate
Blanche Bruce (1841–1898), U.S. Senator from Mississippi from 1875 to 1881
William Cabell Bruce (1860–1946), U.S. Senator from Maryland from 1923 to 1929

United States state senate members
George A. Bruce (1839–1929), Massachusetts State Senate
Terry L. Bruce (born 1944), Illinois State Senate
Terry Bruce (politician) (born 1975), Kansas State Senate